Christopher Bazerque (born March 31, 1987) is a Mauritian football player who currently plays for Petite Rivière Noire SC in the Mauritian Premier League and for the Mauritius national football team as a defender. He is featured on the Mauritian national team in the official 2010 FIFA World Cup video game.

External links

1987 births
Living people
Mauritius international footballers
Mauritian footballers
Petite Rivière Noire FC players
Mauritian Premier League players

Association football defenders